West Kansas was a proposed state of the United States, advocated by a short-lived secessionist movement in the 1990s. This movement was in reaction to a 1992 school finance law that disadvantaged rural schools. The proposed state would have consisted of nine counties from south-western Kansas.

Background
In May 1992, Kansas Governor Joan Finney signed into law a new school finance formula that adversely affected several south-western Kansas counties. These laws raised taxes and shifted state education funding away from rural school districts and into more urban areas. In reaction to this, a group headed by Don O. Concannon advocated the secession of a number of counties from the state.

The group organized a series of straw polls that demonstrated widespread support for secession in nine counties from south-western Kansas: Grant, Haskell, Hodgeman, Kearny, Kiowa, Meade, Morton, Stanton, and Stevens. On September 11, 1992, a constitutional convention was convened in Ulysses, Kansas, at which it was decided to call the new state "West Kansas". A state bird (the pheasant), and a state flower (the yucca) were also chosen.

The West Kansas secession movement ended rather quickly, and a formal petition for secession was never presented to the Kansas Legislature. Seventeen affected school districts filed lawsuits, but at the end of 1994, the Kansas Supreme Court upheld the constitutionality of the 1992 act. University of Oklahoma professor Peter J. McCormick noted in 1995 that "the real differences between the southwest and the rest of Kansas remain, however, as do issues of school control and unfair taxation."

See also
Northern Colorado, another proposed state in which some Kansas counties were involved

References

Politics of Kansas
Proposed states and territories of the United States
Separatism in the United States
1992 in American politics
1992 in Kansas
Regions of Kansas